Myller is a surname. It is the surname of:

 Riitta Myller (born 1956), Finnish politician and former Member of the European Parliament
 Vera Myller (1880–1970), Russian mathematician who became the first female professor in Romania

See also
 Miller (name)
 Moller
 Mueller
 Müller (surname)